Greator Rocks, Greater, or Grea Tor, is a dramatic granite tor on Dartmoor, England. It is a common climbing tor, like nearby Hound Tor. It is 371m above sea level.

References

Tors of Dartmoor
Dartmoor